Henry Smith Carhart, Ph.B. (1844–1920) was an American physicist and university professor. He was born in Coeymans, New York on March 27, 1844, and graduated from Wesleyan University in 1869 and completed an M.A. degree from the same institution in 1873.  He pursued additional graduate studies at Yale, Harvard, and the Humboldt University of Berlin. After serving as professor at Northwestern University, Carhart was appointed to the faculty of the University of Michigan in 1886, where he remained until his retirement as professor emeritus in 1909.

Carhart had a keen interest in electricity. He devised a voltaic cell called the Carhart-Clark cell, among other inventions. He was a delegate from the United States to several electrical congresses, including those at Chicago, Illinois, 1893, at St. Louis, Missouri, 1904, at Berlin, 1905, and at London, 1908. Carhart was president of the board of judges at the department of electricity at the World's Columbian Exposition in Chicago in 1893.

Works
He was the author of textbooks and treatises, including: 
Primary Batteries (1891)
University Physics (1894–96)
Electrical Measurements (1895)
High School Physics, with H. N. Chute (1901)
College Physics (1910)
First Principles of Physics, with H. N. Chute (1912)

References

External links

1844 births
1920 deaths
Wesleyan University alumni
Yale University alumni
Harvard University alumni
Humboldt University of Berlin alumni
Northwestern University faculty
University of Michigan faculty
American physicists
People from Coeymans, New York
Scientists from New York (state)
Presidents of the Electrochemical Society